Ogbronuagum, also called Bukuma after a village in which it is spoken, is a Central Delta language of Nigeria.

Ogbronuagum is gotten from two words "Ogbronu" and "Agum" which would literally mean "the language of the people of Agum". So it would be okay to join the two words "Ogbronu" and "Agum" as "Ogbronuagum".  The language is spoken by people in a town called Bukuma in Rivers State of Nigeria. The town of Bukuma is different from the popular Buguma town.  The towns are close and are both in Rivers State of Nigeria.

References

Indigenous languages of Rivers State
Central Delta languages